Flakstadelva is a river in Innlandet county, Norway. The  river begins in the Lavsjømyrene bog areas in northern Løten. From there it runs in a southerly direction and forms the lake Nybusjøen which discharges into the Lundsbekken river. The river flows in a v-shaped valley which twists before its mouth at the town of Hamar where it empties into the lake Mjøsa. The river's erosion has exposed the lower Cambrian and middle Cambrian rock formations in that region.

See also
List of rivers in Norway

References

Hamar
Løten
Rivers of Innlandet